Proprotein convertase subtilisin/kexin type 5 is an enzyme that in humans is encoded by the PCSK5 gene, found in chromosome 9q21.3  Two alternatively spliced transcripts are described for this gene but only one has its full length nature known.

Function 

The protein encoded by this gene belongs to the subtilisin-like proprotein convertase family. The members of this family are proprotein convertases that process latent precursor proteins into their biologically active products. This encoded protein mediates posttranslational endoproteolytic processing for several integrin alpha subunits. It is thought to process prorenin, pro-membrane type-1 matrix metalloproteinase and HIV-1 glycoprotein gp160.

Clinical significance 

Mutations in this gene have been associated with Currarino syndrome-like malformations.

References

Further reading